is a 1952 Japanese drama film directed by Mikio Naruse. It is based on the 1936 novel by Fumiko Hayashi and was the second in a series of adaptations of Hayashi's work by Naruse after the 1951 Repast.

Plot
23-year-old Kiyoko works as a tour guide in Tokyo. Like her single mother and her three older siblings, all from different fathers, she  lives in the city's Shitamachi area. From her siblings, Kiyoko is closest to her sister Mitsuko, who runs a clothing store with her husband Rohei. Her brother Kasuke is an unemployed war veteran, who wastes his time in pachinko arcades. Her oldest sister Nuiko has her husband Ryuzo invest in a hotel enterprise by baker Tsunakichi, who secretly is Nuiko's lover. Nuiko pushes Kiyoko to date Tsunakichi, and even slaps Kiyoko when she refuses to see him. When Rohei dies, his mistress Ritsu approaches Mitsuko and claims a share from Rohei's life insurance because he his the father of her new born child. Also Nuiko, Kasuke and the mother want to borrow money from Mitsuko for their own pursuits. Mitsuko eventually decides to use the money partly for Ritsu's demands and for opening up her own coffee shop.

Kiyoko becomes frustrated with the tensions in her family and moves out into a flat of her own. She becomes acquainted with Shuzo and Tsubomi, a brother and sister her age living next door, and Kiyoko and Shuzo slowly develop an interest in each other. During a visit to Mitsuko's new café, Kiyoko is repelled to see that Tsunakichi is now involved in her sister's business as well and possibly her lover, and has to fight off his obtrusive advances. When her mother comes to look for the missing Mitsuko at Kiyoko's place, they have an argument about the many fathers Kiyoko grew up with and start crying, while a thunderstorm passes by. Afterwards, Kiyoko offers to buy her mother new summer clothes and walks her home.

Cast
 Hideko Takamine as Kiyoko
 Mitsuko Miura as Mitsuko
 Chieko Murata as Nuiko
 Chieko Nakakita as Ritsu
 Kenzaburo Uemura as Ryuzo
 Kyōko Kagawa as Tsubomi
 Jun Negami as Shuzo
 Sakae Ozawa as Tsunakichi
 Maruyama Osa as Kasuke
 Kumeko Urabe as mother

Awards and legacy
Lightning won the 1952 Blue Ribbon Award for Best Film, Best Director (Mikio Naruse) and Best Supporting Actress (Chieko Nakakita). It was also awarded the 1952 Mainichi Film Concours for the best film score by Ichirō Saitō and again for Best Supporting Actress (Chieko Nakakita).

Film historian Donald Richie called Lightning an "almost perfect realization of Fumiko Hayashi's novel" and "a balanced union of literature and cinema".

References

External links

 
 

1952 films
1952 drama films
Japanese drama films
Japanese black-and-white films
Films based on Japanese novels
Films based on works by Fumiko Hayashi
Films directed by Mikio Naruse
Daiei Film films
Films scored by Ichirō Saitō
1950s Japanese films